Champdieu is a commune in the Loire department in central France.

History
This region was developed into a monastery and surrounding village by Benedictine monks.

Population

See also
Communes of the Loire department

References

Communes of Loire (department)